The Nuragic complex of sa Sedda 'e sos Carros is an archaeological site located in the territory of Oliena, in the Lanaittu Valley, in the province of Nuoro.

The name in Sardinian language means "the passing point of the wagons". The site, which counts numerous huts, dates back to the late Bronze Age and early Iron Age, and is of particular importance because of the melting slides that witness major metallurgical activities. Of great importance is the presence of a roundhouse with basin, one of the best preserved of nuragic Sardinia, the structure is a fountain which worked through a hydraulic implant, water arrived through the mouth of ram shaped protomes into the central basin thanks to a water raceway and lead pipes coming out of the protomes. The site was also a metallurgical center provided with a foundry, iron slags were in fact recovered during archaeological excavations.

Gallery

External links
Complesso nuragico Sa Seddà e Sos Carros 

Archaeological sites in Sardinia